Fleet Logistics Support Squadron 30 (VRC-30), also known as the "Providers", is a United States Navy Fleet Logistics Support squadron based at Naval Air Station North Island consisting of 5 detachments. VRC-30 is one of only two active, carrier-capable, Fleet Logistics Support squadrons, the other being VRC-40.

History
Fleet Logistics Support Squadron Three Zero (VRC-30), traces its ancestry to Air Transport Squadron Five (VR-5) which was established on 24 June 1943 at Naval Air Station Seattle. The squadron was tasked with flying the Douglas R4D Skytrain, Douglas R5D Skymaster, Beechcraft SNB Expeditor , and the Noorduyn JA-1 Norseman aircraft in regular air service to Seattle, Oakland, San Francisco, the Aleutian Islands, Fairbanks , and Point Barrow on the Alaskan Mainland.

In 1948, the Naval Air Transportation Service and Air Transport Command merged and became the Military Air Transport Service. VR-5 was placed under the command of the newly formed MATS and assigned to the U.S. Pacific Fleet.

1950s
In 1950, VR-5 moved its base of operations from NAS Seattle to Naval Air Station Moffett Field, California. Detachments were established in Seattle and at Naval Air Station North Island, California. VR-5 was decommissioned on 15 July 1957 and became VR-21, with detachments at Naval Air Facility Atsugi, Japan and NAS North Island. 

VR-21 was the first squadron to fly dedicated Carrier Onboard Delivery (COD) aircraft, the TBM-3Rs. The detachment relocated to NAS Alameda in 1960.

VR-21 was also at Naval Air Station Barbers Point, Hawaii, flying C-118B Liftmasters into the early 1970s.

1960s and 1970s
The Atsugi detachment VRC-50, and the Alameda Detachment was commissioned as Fleet Tactical Support Squadron Three Zero (VR-30) equipped with Convair C-131 Samaritans and C-1A Trader aircraft. VR-30's mission included logistics support for Commander in Chief U.S. Pacific Fleet units. The squadron was awarded the Meritorious Unit Commendation for exemplary service from 1 January to 30 November 1967. From 1968 to 1973, VR-30 COD detachments operated aboard various carriers in support of recovery operations for Apollo X, XI, XII, and XVI.

In 1969, squadron C-1As and crews operated from Danang, Republic of Vietnam, in support of CTF-77. In 1971 VR-30 joined the Jet Age with two North American CT-39 Saberliners for high-speed executive airlift. In May 1973 the squadron received the first of four C-9B Skytrain IIs to further improve its logistics support capability.

On 12 March 1974 the Navy's first female Aviator, Lieutenant (Junior Grade) Barbara A. Allen reported for duty. After relocating to NAS North Island, VR-30 was decommissioned on 1 October 1978 and VRC-30 was concurrently commissioned.

1980s
In February 1980, VRC-30 added the C-12 Fleet Replacement Squadron, providing ground and flight instruction for all Pacific Fleet Navy and Marine Corps Pilots and Aircrew in the UC-12B/F Beechcraft Super King Air. VRC-30's C-12 FRS acts as the Commander, Naval Air Force, U.S. Pacific Fleet NATOPS Model Manager and Unit Evaluator, in addition to their primary job of flight instruction. VRC-30 retired the 6 C-1A Trader Aircraft and transitioned to the C-2A Greyhound in late 1985 by accepting deliveries of five C-2A Greyhounds. These were later replaced by a newer re-procured version of the aircraft, the C-2A(R).

1990s

In 1994 VRC-30 took sole responsibility for Pacific Fleet C-2 operations by absorbing personnel and aircraft when VRC-50 was decommissioned. VRC-30 DET Five was established in August 1994 in Atsugi, Japan as part of Carrier Air Wing Five and the Forward Deployed Naval Forces. Four deployable sea going detachments were formed at North Island, supported by a "homeguard" shore component. In 1997 VRC-30's detachment Three became the first fully integrated, night-capable C-2 detachment when it deployed with CVW-2 aboard .
1998 proved to be another banner year for the Providers at VRC-30. Provider detachments continued to set the standard for day/night logistics support with two highly successful deployments. Detachment One posted an impressive total of over 290,000 lbs. of cargo, 175,000 lbs. of mail, and over 2300 passengers carried in support of the  Battlegroup. While on WESTPAC Detachment One earned the Golden Hook Award for the best landing grades in the Airwing, a squadron first. Detachment Two aboard  followed suit, operating daily in support of Operation Desert Fox and Operation Southern Watch. In the calendar year 1998, VRC-30 was able to accomplish astounding results including: 1356 carrier landings, 14,360 passengers, 1,877,973 lbs of cargo, and a sortie completion rate of 99.9%.

As of December 1999, the squadron has achieved 24 years and over 149,600 hours of accident-free flight. VRC30 was awarded the Chief of Naval Operations  Safety Award six times between 1979 and 1992 and the Meritorious Unit Commendation for exemplary service from October 1993 to September 1994. In 1996 the Providers were awarded their first ever Commander, Naval Air Forces Pacific Battle Efficiency Award and again received the honor in 1998. VRC-30 again garnered the CNO Aviation Safety Award in 1998. In March 1998 the command adopted a full detachment concept, as a result of a 140-person reduction in manning. As a result; all five detachments have remained active throughout the turn around cycle.

2000s

The Squadron participated in every major military exercise on the west coast as well as combat operations in support of Operation IRAQI FREEDOM and Operation ENDURING FREEDOM. The Providers again earned the COMNAVAIRPAC Battle Efficiency Award in 2002 and 2003. In 2004 VRC-30 stood down C-12 operations, focusing solely on the COD mission.

The years to follow saw several major developments and upgrades in the C-2A, beginning with the critical Service Life Extension Program (SLEP) in 2006. The SLEP increased the airframe lifespan from 10,000 flight hours or 15,000 carrier landings to 15,000 flight hours or 36,000 carrier landings. The program will allow the current fleet of Greyhounds to operate until 2027. The SLEP was followed by an aircraft rewire in 2008, and the most recent LOT 4 upgrade in August 2010. The LOT 4 upgrade, completed in September 2012, provided pilots with a new CNS-ATM glass cockpit and the eight-bladed NP2000 propeller system, which increased performance, reduced airframe vibration, and improved maintainability. During this period of substantial change and while maintaining a high operational tempo, the Providers continued to earn five more Battle Efficiency awards in 2005, 2006, 2007, 2011 and 2012.

The Providers delivered over 2.1 million pounds of cargo and mail to the fleet and more than 16,000 passengers and Distinguished Visitors were safely transported to and from carriers at sea. In addition, the FRS side of the house trained 82 new Fleet ready C-12 pilots and instructor pilots and 47 newly qualified C-12/26 Aircrew.

It was the first loss of a C-2 since 2005, and the first fatal accident since 1973. The aircraft was located in 18,500ft (5,640 meters) in the last week of December 2017, when a salvage ship used a pinger receiver to locate the aircraft's emergency signal. There will be an attempt to salvage the aircraft and the three Sailors expected to be inside.

Following the 2017 incident, VRC-30 Det. 5 went through multiple inspections and rigorous training in order to prevent further casualties. The detachment received the Battle Efficiency Ribbon in 2019.

Detachments

See also
 History of the United States Navy
 List of United States Navy aircraft squadrons

References

External links
VRC-30 Official Website

Fleet logistics support squadrons of the United States Navy